Colin Linwood Buchan (1890 – 16 April 1947) was a Scottish professional football outside left who played in the Scottish League for Queen's Park.

Biography

Buchan was born in Bradford, Yorkshire, to Scottish parents James Buchan of Hawick, Roxburghshire and Mary Jane Buchan of Peebles, Scottish Borders. His father was a woolsorter, but they moved back to Peebles shortly after Colin's birth.

On 25 August 1914, just over three weeks after Britain's entry into the First World War, Buchan enlisted in the Royal Field Artillery. He became a Battery Quartermaster Sergeant and was wounded late in the war, but recovered and returned to football.

Buchan played in England, Scotland, and Northern Ireland, signed to play for Linfield F.C. in 1920. He returned to his hometown and played for the Peebles Rovers F.C. in 1923.

In 1933, when Billy McCandless returned to manage Dundee, he recalled of Buchan, "The last year I was with Linfield I had as a colleague one of the most gentlemanly footballers who ever kicked a ball in Ireland, Colin Buchan, who came from Dundee."

He died in 1947 and is buried at Peebles St Andrews Cemetery.

Career statistics

References

External links

1890 births
1947 deaths
Date of birth missing
Scottish footballers
Scottish Football League players
British Army personnel of World War I
Royal Field Artillery soldiers
Association football inside forwards
Queen's Park F.C. players
St Bernard's F.C. players
Dundee F.C. players
Linfield F.C. players
NIFL Premiership players